Phaius amboinensis, commonly known as Arnhem Land swamp orchid, is a plant in the orchid family and is native to areas from Malesia through to New Guinea, Australia and islands in the Pacific Ocean. It is an evergreen, terrestrial herb with up to eight pleated leaves and up to twenty, relatively large white flowers with a yellow labellum. It grows in wet, shady forests.

Description
Phaius amboinensis is an evergreen, terrestrial herb which forms large clumps. The petals are a similar length to the sepals but narrower. There is a complex callus in the centre of the labellum. Flowering occurs from August to November in Australia and over a longer period in Asia.

Taxonomy and naming
Phaius amboinensis was first formally described in 1856 by Carl Ludwig Blume in his book Museum Botanicum Lugduno-Batavum sive stirpium Exoticarum, Novarum vel Minus Cognitarum ex Vivis aut Siccis Brevis Expositio et Descriptio. The specific epithet (amboinensis) is a reference to Ambon Island where the type specimen was collected.

Distribution and habitat
The Arnhem Land swamp orchid in deep shade in wet forests. It occurs in Indonesia, the Philippines, New Guinea, the Northern Territory, New Caledonia, the Solomon Islands, Vanuatu and Samoa.

References

Plants described in 1856
amboinensis
Orchids of the Northern Territory
Orchids of Indonesia
Orchids of New Guinea
Orchids of Oceania
Orchids of the Philippines